Tillandsia helmutii is a species of flowering plant in the genus Tillandsia. This species is endemic to the flood plains of the Rio Chico in chuquisaca, Bolivia at elevations of around 1800m.

Description
In the wild, Tillandsia helmutii grows as a lithophyte. It grows as a rosette, sometimes with multiple branches. on mature plants, the leaves are each 20-30cm long and are Densely polystichous. leaves closer to the growing point are fully erect while closer to the outside of the plant, they droop slightly outwards.

References

helmutii
Flora of Bolivia